Steven Vincent Gordon Sonny Furlano (born February 6, 1998) is a Canadian soccer player who plays as a midfielder.

Club career

Early career 
Furlano began playing football at the age of five at Barrie SC. He later attended St. Peter’s Secondary School and Bill Crothers Secondary School.

Toronto FC 
In 2013, he joined the Toronto FC Academy, and joined Toronto FC II, Toronto FC's reserve team, ahead of the 2016 USL season. He made his debut as a substitute on May 25, 2016, coming off the bench for the final seven minutes in a 2-1 defeat to Pittsburgh Riverhounds.

Alliance United 
In 2018, Furlano played for League1 Ontario side Alliance United, scoring nine goals in fourteen appearances in league play and made another two appearances in the playoffs.

York9 FC
On December 20, 2018, Furlano signed his first professional contract with Canadian Premier League side York9 FC. Furlano made fifteen league appearances and three in the Canadian Championship that season. On November 15, 2019, the club announced that Furlano would not be returning for the 2020 season.

International career 
Furlano first featured in the Canadian youth program in 2013, and despite being named in three Under-15 camps is yet to make his international debut at youth or senior level. He was named to the U15 national team for the 2013 Copa de México de Naciones.

Career statistics

References

External links 

1998 births
Living people
Association football defenders
Canadian soccer players
Soccer players from Simcoe County
Sportspeople from Barrie
Toronto FC players
Toronto FC II players
York United FC players
League1 Ontario players
USL Championship players
Canadian Premier League players
Alliance United FC players
Darby FC players